The men's individual épée competition at the 2010 Asian Games in Guangzhou was held on 18 November at the Guangda Gymnasium.

Schedule
All times are China Standard Time (UTC+08:00)

Results

Round of pools

Pool 1

Pool 2

Pool 3

Pool 4

Pool 5

Summary

Knockout round

Final

Top half

Bottom half

Final standing

References
Men's Individual Epée Results

External links
Official website 

Men Epee